This is a complete list of the operas of the Italian composer Carlo Coccia (1782–1873).

List of operas

References
 Budden, Julian; Libby, Denis; Maguire, Simon (2001), "Coccia, Carlo", The New Grove Dictionary of Music and Musicians, Second Edition London: Macmillan. .
Maguire, Simon (1998),  “Coccia, Carlo” in Stanley Sadie, (Ed.), The New Grove Dictionary of Opera, Vol. One, pp. 891—892. London: Macmillan Publishers, Inc.   

Lists of operas by composer
 
Lists of compositions by composer